Anolis distichus, the bark anole, North Caribbean bark anole, or Hispaniolan gracile anole, is a species of anole lizard native to Hispaniola (both the Dominican Republic and Haiti) and the Bahamas, and introduced to Florida, where it was first recorded in 1946. It spends most its time on tree trunks. There are several subspecies and it is highly variable in color. Its body ranges from gray-brown to green, and the dewlap is cream-white, over yellow and orange to red. In Florida, most are gray-brown with a cream-white (pale yellow) dewlap, but more greenish individuals with a yellow-edged red dewlap also occur.

Subspecies

Subspecies listed alphabetically. Some of these may warrant recognition as separate species.

A. d. distichus Cope, 1861
A. d. biminiensis Oliver, 1948
A. d. dapsilis Schwartz, 1968
A. d. distichoides Rosén 1911
A. d. floridanus Smith & Mccauley 1948
A. d. juliae Cochran 1934
A. d. ocior Schwartz, 1968
A. d. patruelis Schwartz, 1968
A. d. sejunctus Schwartz, 1968
A. d. suppar Schwartz, 1968
A. d. tostus Schwartz, 1968

References

External links

distichus
Lizards of the Caribbean
Reptiles of the Dominican Republic
Reptiles of Haiti
Reptiles described in 1861
Taxa named by Edward Drinker Cope